This is a list of notable theatre managers and theatrical producers grouped alphabetically by country or area, then alphabetically by surname.

Australia and New Zealand 

 J. C. Williamson

United Kingdom and Ireland

Lilian Baylis
Binkie Beaumont
Alfred Bunn
Matthew Churchill
Giles Richard Cooper
Richard D'Oyly Carte
Rupert D'Oyly Carte
George Dance
George Edwardes
Robert Evett
Sonia Friedman
David Garrick
George Grossmith, Jr.
Fred Karno
Bill Kenwright
Cameron Mackintosh
Thomas German Reed
Michael Scott
Marc Sinden

United States

A–M

Doris Abrahams
Catherine Adler
Hunter Arnold
Emmanuel Azenberg
David Belasco
Roger Berlind
David Binder
Kermit Bloomgarden
Robert Boyett
Ruben Brache
Mel Brooks
Arthur Cantor
Alexander H. Cohen
Ryan Cole
Bonnie Comley
Katharine Cornell
Jean Dalrymple
Ken Davenport
A.L. Erlanger
Jeffrey Finn
Cy Feuer
Justin Field
William Franzblau
Charles Frohman
Daniel Frohman
Gustave Frohman
David Geffen
Bernard Gersten
Morris Gest
Roger Gindi 
Robert E. Griffith
Oscar Hammerstein II
Leland Hayward
Oscar Jaffe
Elia Kazan
John Kenley
Sarah Kirby-Stark
Marc Klaw
Terry Allen Kramer
Stewart F. Lane
Bruce Lazarus
Mitch Leigh
Herman Levin
Margo Lion
Hal Luftig
Ken Mahoney
Christopher Massimine
Dana Matthow
Gilbert Miller
Henry Miller
David Merrick
Ben Mordecai 
Oliver Morosco
Stephen Moorer

N–Z

James L. Nederlander
James M. Nederlander
Samuel F. Nixon
Joseph Papp
H. C. Potter
Hal Prince
Richard Rodgers
Philip Rose
Daryl Roth
Jordan Roth
Emily Sanders
Irene Mayer Selznick
Shubert brothers
George D. Sweet
Mike Todd
Lawrence Toppall
George C. Tyler
Frederic B. Vogel
John C. Wilson
A. H. Woods
Florenz Ziegfeld
Scott Zeilinger
J. Fred Zimmerman, Jr.

See also

List of theatre personnel

References

Theatre managers and producers

Managers and producers